Pei County, or Peixian, is under the administration of Xuzhou, Jiangsu province, China, bordering the Shandong prefecture-level cities of Jining to the northwest and Zaozhuang to the northeast and sitting on the western shore of Nansi Lake.

History
Pei County was the hometown of Liu Bang, the founding emperor of the Han dynasty. Also, the hometown of Fan Kuai, Liu Bang's oath brother, one of the most well-known lords who helped Liu Bang to overthrow the Qin Dynasty and establish the Han Dynasty. Fan Kuai's descendants are still living in Pei County now.

Xiaopei (小沛) is an ancient Chinese town located in present-day Pei County. In the late Eastern Han dynasty, it was under the jurisdiction of the Xu Province, which was governed by Tao Qian. Before Tao Qian died, he handed his governorship over to Liu Bei. Liu Bei took refuge in Xiaopei when Lü Bu seized the Xu Province from him through deceit.

Administrative divisions
In the present, Pei County has 15 towns.
15 towns

Climate

References

External links
Official website of Pei County government
www.xzqh.org 

County-level divisions of Jiangsu
Administrative divisions of Xuzhou